New Orleans Union Passenger Terminal (NOUPT) is an intermodal facility in New Orleans, Louisiana, US.  Located at 1001 Loyola Avenue, it is served by Amtrak, Greyhound Lines, Megabus, and NORTA with direct connections to the Rampart–St. Claude Streetcar Line.

The station is the major southern terminus hub for Amtrak, serving three long-distance trains, the City of New Orleans, the Crescent, and the Sunset Limited.  Between 1993 and the strike of Hurricane Katrina in 2005, the Sunset Limited continued east to Florida. Since the hurricane, New Orleans has been the eastern terminus of the route, although in 2016 Amtrak did propose bringing back service east of New Orleans.

Amtrak also operates a coach and engine yard near the terminal.

History 

Union Passenger Terminal was built just west of the older New Orleans Union Station to consolidate the city's passenger rail operations. Previously, New Orleans had been served by five stations–Union Station, the Southern Railway Terminal, T&P Station, Louisiana & Arkansas Station, and Louisville & Nashville Station.

Parts of the station property also are over what once was the turning basin for the New Basin Canal.  The main lead track to the terminal follows the path of the old canal (which was filled in) and the Pontchartrain Expressway/I-10.

NOUPT was designed in 1949 by the New Orleans architectural firms of Wogan and Bernard, Jules K. de la Vergne, and August Perez and Associates. When it opened in 1954, it was considered an ultramodern facility, completed just at the time that air travel was taking off at the expense of rail travel.

The stub-end terminal consists of covered platforms and a modern waiting hall. The freight and express houses are now the domain of the Smoothie King Center and Main Post Office.

In the 1970s, parts of two platforms were shortened to allow for Greyhound Lines to move its service there, creating an intermodal facility.

Following Hurricane Katrina, Amtrak provided the first commercial transportation out of New Orleans. During the recovery efforts, the bus station at NOUPT was used for a temporary jail nicknamed Camp Greyhound.

In January 2013, the station became the terminus for the new mile-long Loyola Avenue-Union Passenger Terminal Streetcar Line connecting Canal Street with the Central Business District and destinations such as the Superdome. The $52 million project was largely funded through a $45 million Transportation Investments Generating Economic Recovery (TIGER) grant awarded to the New Orleans Regional Transit Authority by the U.S. Department of Transportation.

Megabus started operations at the Union Passenger Terminal in 2015.

Gulf Coast regional officials have been advocating for restoration of daily train service between New Orleans and Florida since 2016.

In February 2021, it was announced that passenger rail service would return to the Gulf Coast with an Amtrak route from New Orleans to Mobile; stops include Bay St. Louis, Gulfport, Biloxi, and Pascagoula. Service is expected to begin in 2023.

References

External links 

New Orleans Amtrak and Streetcar Station (USA Rail Guide — Train Web)
New Orleans Regional Transit Authority
Southern High-Speed Rail Commission
The Southeastern Architectural Archive, Special Collections Division, Tulane University Libraries
Photographs of Albrizio mural on Flickr
Article on restoration of Albrizio mural
HawkinsRails' NOUPT scrapbook

Amtrak stations in Louisiana
Transportation buildings and structures in New Orleans
Union stations in the United States
Railway stations in the United States opened in 1954
Economy of New Orleans
Transit centers in the United States
1954 establishments in Louisiana
Former Illinois Central Railroad stations
Former Kansas City Southern Railway stations
Former Southern Pacific Railroad stations
Former Missouri Pacific Railroad stations
Former Louisville and Nashville Railroad stations
Former Texas and Pacific Railway stations
Former Southern Railway (U.S.) stations